The 2015 Booker Prize for Fiction was awarded at a ceremony on 13 October 2015. A longlist of thirteen titles was announced on 29 July, narrowed down to a shortlist of six titles on 15 September.

Judging panel
Michael Wood (Chair)
Ellah Wakatama Allfrey
John Burnside
Sam Leith
Frances Osborne

Nominees (shortlist)

Nominees (longlist)

Winner

On 13 October, chair judge Michael Wood announced that Jamaican author Marlon James had won the 2015 Man Booker Prize for his novel A Brief History of Seven Killings. This is the first time that a Jamaican-born author has won the prize.

See also
 List of winners and shortlisted authors of the Booker Prize for Fiction

References

Man Booker
Booker Prizes by year
2015 awards in the United Kingdom